Koyla ( Coal) is a 1997 Indian Hindi-language action thriller film directed, co-written and produced by Rakesh Roshan, which stars Shah Rukh Khan, Madhuri Dixit and Amrish Puri in lead roles, while Johnny Lever, Ashok Saraf, Salim Ghouse, Deepshikha and Himani Shivpuri appear in supporting roles. Mohnish Bahl makes a special appearance in the film. The film was released worldwide on 18 April 1997 and was declared an average grosser at the box office, earning over 28.05 crore worldwide against a budget of 11.90 crore. Critics praised the action sequences performed by Khan, and it emerged as the 8th most successful film of 1997 in India. Some scenes of the film were shot in Tawang, Arunachal Pradesh. This is the third and final collaboration between Shah Rukh Khan and Rakesh Roshan, due to Rakesh's son Hrithik Roshan entering films and replacing Shah Rukh Khan in Rakesh's films. The film earned Puri a Best Villain at the 43rd Filmfare Awards.

Plot
 

Handsome but mute, Shankar is raised by the powerful Raja, to whom he is loyal. But he treats him like a slave. Shankar is also unnecessarily beaten by Raja's brother Brijwa, a violent psychopath. A ruthless and cruel man with a large appetite for young women, Raja kills anyone who dares to defy him.

Raja sees Gauri, a happy innocent villager, and wishes to marry her. However, she wants to see a photo of her future husband first. Aware that she would instantly reject him, he sends her a photo of Shankar. Gauri instantly agrees, and the wedding proceeds.

However, before the ceremony is completed, she discovers that Shankar isn't her groom and faints; Raja orders the priest to continue, though the marriage would be invalid while Gauri is unconscious.
When she regains consciousness, she sees Raja trying to consummate with her and is shocked knowing they're married. He imprisons and tortures her.

Gauri tries to commit suicide but Shankar saves her. She accuses him of ruining her life but upon knowing his innocence thanks to the son of Raja's doctor who sometimes serves as his interpreter, she is sorry. When Gauri's brother Ashok comes to see her, Raja threatens her to lie to him that she is happy otherwise he will kill Ashok. Gauri does so.

However, Shankar, unable to see Gauri in misery, reveals the truth to Ashok by writing in the dirt as Ashok is about to leave. Raja and Brijwa kill Ashok who returned to rescue Gauri. Moments before dying, he has Shankar promise him to save Gauri; she and Shankar flee Raja's mansion. Enraged, Raja begins a murderous search to find Gauri and Shankar with the help of an old friend of his who is a corrupt DIG.

After a long chase by jungle and mountains, Shankar uses his survival skills to kill Raja's men. Raja and his men leave due to being disadvantaged. During this, Gauri and Shankar begin to fall in love. Unexpectedly, Raja who is back with reinforcements sees and captures them by shooting Gauri in the arm.

Shankar is brutally beaten by Brijwa, and the corrupt DIG, and Raja slits his throat, then leaves him to die in the mountains; and Gauri is sold to a brothel after Raja discovers she loves Shankar. There, Bindya, Raja's former lover who was disowned by him after she too fell for Shankar once (when he tried to protect her from being raped by Brijwa and was beaten well) and was sold to the same brothel, saves Gauri from what had been done to her. To stop her from doing so, Brijwa at his brother's orders, humiliates her in public, before stabbing her with a knife when she tries to do the same to him in order to protect Gauri. Shankar is found and saved by a village boy who brings him to and his grandfather (a healer), who operates on his throat while he is still unconscious. The healer, who discovers that Shankar is not mute by birth, is able to repair some of the damaged nerves in Shankar's throat, enabling him to speak.

While recovering, Shankar recalls that when he was a boy, his father discovered diamonds in the coal mine, however, he and his wife were murdered in front of Shankar by two mysterious men; when young Shankar threatened to tell his parents' colleagues what they did, someone came up from behind him and shoved hot coals into his throat, rendering him mute. Raja, who had known Shankar's parents, ordered the police to kill those men, but unknown to everyone, Shankar included, the police led by the DIG only pretended to kill the men while Raja adopted Shankar. Shankar recovers and returns; first, he fights and kills Brijwa and is reunited with Gauri after rescuing her from the same men that killed his parents, and bought Gauri from the brothel, killing one of the men in the process. Simultaneously, while killing him, Shankar discovers that Raja was the person who made him mute and who ordered his parents to be killed so he could steal their wealth. In the meantime, he reunites with Raja's doctor and son who believed him dead.

With Gauri's help as well as that of the doctor's son, he kills Raja's other henchman and then reveals the crimes of Raja to Raja's coal miners, at which Gauri arrives with her uncle and aunt, forcing them to admit their involvement in making her marry Raja. Raja's doctor and his son turn against Raja, notifying everyone that Raja not only deceived Gauri but has been responsible for numerous killings as well as rapes before ordering everyone to throw rocks at him and his men although Raja is able to shoot a few of the workers as well as his doctor in the arm. In the chaos, the DIG scares everyone away by throwing grenades but is killed by Shankar, who then chases and finally manages to fight and corner Raja, who begs for his life, trying to give Shankar reasons for why he should live by pointing out that he adopted him and saved his life, but Shankar disregards this by counterpointing that Raja had adopted him to make him a slave and after dodging a pickaxe thrown at him by Raja kills the evil man by spilling oil and coal around Raja and through that setting him on fire with a burning rock. At last, Shankar and Gauri embrace each other, finally at peace.

Cast
Shah Rukh Khan as Shankar Hariya Thakur 
Madhuri Dixit as Gauri Singh
Amrish Puri as Raja Choudhury 
Ranjeet as Dilawar Bapat
Salim Ghouse as Brijwa Choudhury
Deepshikha Nagpal as Bindiya Singh
Jack Gaud as Ranbir Chauhan
Johnny Lever as Dev Narayan/Chhote
Mohnish Bahl as Ashok Singh
Ashok Saraf as Ved "Vedji" Narayan 
Himani Shivpuri as Chanda Bai
Suresh Chatwal as Sanjay Singh
Shubha Khote as Sumitra Singh
Rammohan Sharma as Old man
Kunika as Rasili
Vikas Anand as Haria
Pradeep Rawat as Police Commissioner
Dev Malhotra as Minor murdered by Raja
Razak Khan as Impotent party guest

Production

Development

Rakesh Roshan got the idea of making Koyla when he was shooting for his another directorial venture, which was delayed-since 1992 and finally released in 2000, titled Karobaar: The Business of Love. The film tells the story of a simple-hearted village girl who falls in love with her torturing husband's mute servant and how the mute man takes revenge against his boss. The film was also Rakesh Roshan's first film to feature DTS 5.1 surround sound.

Casting

Roshan approached Sunny Deol for the role of Shankar after watching the latter's action scenes in the 1996 films Jeet and Ghatak: Lethal. But due to unknown reasons, Deol rejected the role. Upon his refusal, the role was offered to Shah Rukh Khan, who had worked with Roshan in his films King Uncle (1993) and Karan Arjun (1995).

Sonali Bendre was Roshan's first choice to play the role of Gauri. Later, Roshan replaced her with Madhuri Dixit for unknown reasons. The film marked the second collaboration between Khan and Dixit following Anjaam (1994) after which they also starred in Dil To Pagal Hai (1997),  Gaja Gamini (2000), Hum Tumhare Hain Sanam (2002) and Devdas (2002).

Filming

Principal photography of Koyla began in June 1996. A song of the film, Tanhai Tanhai, and some of the scenes, were shot in Tawang. Other scenes were also filmed in Hyderabad and south areas of Ooty.

During the shooting of the film's one of the popular songs, Ghungte Mein Chanda, Khan fractured his leg. The other song of the film, Dekha Tujhe Toh, was to be therefore exited from the film because of his fracture, but after Khan's leg got fully well, the song was shot. The sound of real pots were used for the background music of Dekha Tujhe Toh. A scene of the film was loosely inspired from the 1994 Hollywood film Forrest Gump.

Soundtrack 
"Tanhai Tanhai" and "Dekha Tujhe To" became very popular upon release. The theme song was credited from the movie Conquest of Paradise. "Sanson Ki Mala Pe" was based on a bhajan by Mirabai.

Box office 

It is the 9th-highest-grossing Bollywood film of 1997 worldwide.

India

It opened on Friday, 18 April 1997, across 275 screens, and had a record opening of  nett. The film shared the record for the highest opening day with the previous record opener Trimurti which also grossed  nett on its opening day. It went on to break  nett opening weekend record set by Trimurti, and recorded highest ever opening weekend of  nett. It had a first week of  nett. The film earned a total of  nett.

Overseas

It earned $600,000 (2.14 crore) outside India.

Awards 
Filmfare Award for Best Performance in a Negative Role - Amrish Puri - Nominated

References

External links 
 

1997 films
1990s Hindi-language films
1997 action thriller films
Indian action thriller films
Films shot in Arunachal Pradesh
Indian films about revenge
Films directed by Rakesh Roshan
Films scored by Rajesh Roshan
1990s masala films
Films with screenplays by Sachin Bhowmick
Films about rape in India
Indian rape and revenge films
Tawang Town